Andrew Robert Norman (born 26 January 1963) was Principal of Ridley Hall, Cambridge between November 2008 and December 2016. In January 2017 he took up the post of Director of Ministry and Mission in the Diocese of Leeds.

He was educated at Ardingly College and subsequently read PPE at University College, Oxford graduating in 1984. He further attended Selwyn College, Cambridge (MA Theology, 1999) and the University of Birmingham (MPhil Missiology, 2007).

References

1963 births
Living people
People educated at Ardingly College
Alumni of University College, Oxford
Alumni of Selwyn College, Cambridge
Alumni of the University of Birmingham
Staff of Ridley Hall, Cambridge